Badminton was contested at the 1990 Asian Games in Beijing, China from 28 September to 6 October. Singles, doubles, and team events were contested for both men and women. Mixed doubles were also contested.

The competition was held at the Beijing Gymnasium in Beijing, China.

Medalists

Medal table

Participating nations
A total of 101 athletes from 10 nations competed in badminton at the 1990 Asian Games:

References

External links
Results

 
1990 Asian Games events
1990
Asian Games
1990 Asian Games